The Pasadena Subdivision is the remnant branch line of the former Atchison, Topeka and Santa Fe Railway (AT&SF) Los Angeles Second District. The line currently branches off of Metrolink’s San Bernardino Line at CP Cambridge in Claremont. The line follows a generally east–west alignment, passed through the cities of Claremont, Pomona, La Verne, San Dimas, Glendora, and Azusa before coming to a truncated end in Irwindale. For most of its length, it shares the corridor with the Los Angeles Metro Rail’s L Line. Recent construction, known as the Foothill Extension Phase 2B, has seen the tracks out of service west of San Dimas for most of 2021.

History
The line was initially built by the Los Angeles and San Gabriel Valley Railroad (LA&SGV) in 1885. LA&SGV was sold and consolidated on May 20, 1887, into the California Central Railway. In 1889 this was consolidated into Southern California Railway Company. On January 17, 1906, the Southern California Railway was sold to AT&SF.

Coupled with the San Bernardino and Los Angeles Railroad, it now was assigned as the Second District of the AT&SF Los Angeles Division. At one point, this line hosted up to 26 passenger trains each day, including the famed Super Chief and El Capitan. Priority AT&SF freight trains also used the line, usually westbound and local freight along the corridor.

The line hosted the Desert Wind until 1986 and continued to serve the San Gabriel Valley and host the Southwest Chief until 1994, when the 1994 Northridge earthquake damaged the bridge over the eastbound lanes of Interstate 210 (I-210) in Arcadia. The closure of the route forced Amtrak to terminate service into Pasadena and reroute the Southwest Chief through Orange County instead. In the late 1990s, construction of the Gold Line (now the L Line) began on various sections of the former subdivision along I-210, with service commencing on July 26, 2003.

In 2013 reconstruction along the former roadbed from Sierra Madre Villa station to APU/Citrus College station began with the Gold Line Foothill Extension and was completed in late 2015. The line currently terminates at APU/Citrus College station,  past the site of the former Azusa station (now served by Azusa Downtown station on the L Line); service started on March 5, 2016. The final planned phase of the light rail line's buildout will complete the reinstatement of passenger service along the corridor, though dedicated freight tracks will remain.

See also 
L Line (Los Angeles Metro)
Foothill Extension
Metrolink (California)
San Bernardino Line
Desert Wind
Southwest Chief

References

 
 
California History, VOLUME LXVII NO. 1-4 1988, CONTENTS, California Historical Society SAN FRANCISCO • LOS ANGELES • SAN MARINO, NUMBER 1— MARCH 1988

External links
 railgiants.org, Santa Fe Station, Arcadia CA, circa 1887
  Abandon Rail Line, The Second District of the AT&SF
monroviacc.com, Monrovia at 125: “Trees, Trains, Troubles, and Triumphs.” By Steve Baker
Digital Library Los Angeles and San Gabriel Valley Railroad Depot at Alison Street and Anderson Street, Los Angeles, 1884
Photo, Stock in  Los Angeles and San Gabriel Valley Railroad
 History of Pomona Valley, California, with Biographical Sketches of The Leading Men and Women of the Valley Who, Have Been Identified With Its Growth and Development from the Early Days to the Present, HISTORIC RECORD COMPANY, LOS ANGELES, CAL. 1920
LA Mag., CityDig: Monrovia's 1887 Real Estate Bubble 2/12/2014 by Glen Creason

Atchison, Topeka and Santa Fe Railway lines
Metrolink (California) lines